Lepyrus oregonus is a species of true weevil in the beetle family Curculionidae. It is found in North America.

Subspecies
These two subspecies belong to the species Lepyrus oregonus:
 Lepyrus oregonus oregonus Casey, 1895
 Lepyrus oregonus tessellatus Van Dyke, 1928

References

Further reading

 
 

Molytinae
Articles created by Qbugbot
Beetles described in 1895